Pakistan participated in the 1958 Asian Games held in the city of Tokyo, Japan, from 24 May to 1 June 1958. Pakistan ranked fifth with six gold medals in this edition of the Asiad.

Medal table

References

Nations at the 1958 Asian Games
1958
Asian Games